Hilton Towers, Hilton & Towers or Hilton Tower may refer to:

Hilton & Towers Chicago, former name of Hilton Chicago
Hilton Towers Mumbai, former name of Trident Nariman Point Mumbai Hotel
Pittsburgh Hilton & Towers, former name of Wyndham Grand Pittsburgh Downtown
Beetham Tower, Manchester, also called Hilton Tower